Matt Marquess (born January 29, 1986) is an American retired soccer player.

Career

College and Amateur
Marquess grew up in Palo Alto, California, played college soccer for UC Santa Cruz and Santa Clara University, and in the USL Premier Development League for San Jose Frogs

Professional
Marquess was drafted in the third round (39th overall) of the 2008 MLS SuperDraft by Kansas City Wizards. He made his full professional debut for the Wizards on 1 July 2008, in a US Open Cup third round game against the Carolina RailHawks.

Marquess quietly retired from professional soccer in January 2010 after making just six professional appearances for Kansas City Wizards.

References

External links
MLS player profile

1986 births
Living people
American soccer players
Soccer players from Tennessee
Sporting Kansas City players
San Jose Frogs players
Major League Soccer players
UC Santa Cruz Banana Slugs men's soccer players
Santa Clara Broncos men's soccer players
USL League Two players
Sporting Kansas City draft picks
Sportspeople from Nashville, Tennessee
Association football defenders